"Gambit" is the 156th and 157th episodes of the American science fiction television series Star Trek: The Next Generation, which are the fourth and fifth episodes of the seventh season.

Set in the 24th century, the series follows the adventures of the Starfleet crew of the Federation starship Enterprise-D. In this episode, after hearing a rumor that Captain Picard has been murdered while on an archeological dig, the Enterprise crew sets out to find the smugglers who may have been responsible.

The episode(s) guest stars include actor Richard Lynch, and Star Trek film veteran Robin Curtis.

Plot
Riker, Troi, Crusher, and Worf investigate Picard's whereabouts in a musty bar, describing him as a "smooth-headed" human. They find a criminal who knows something; he says that Picard had been asking a group about some artifacts when a fight broke out and Picard was "vaporized".

Many of the crew members accept this as true, but Riker insists on finding out who killed Captain Picard. The crew begins by retracing Picard's steps, and this leads them to a planet housing one of the most ancient archaeological sites in the galaxy. However, the artifacts have been stolen by a group of mercenaries. While Riker, Worf, La Forge, and a few ensigns are exploring, a variety of humanoids beam down and attack the away team. They kill one ensign and capture Commander Riker.

Riker is taken on board the mercenary ship, which is commanded by Arctus Baran. Riker finds that a device has been implanted within his body which allows Baran to inflict pain on him. Everyone on the ship has similar devices implanted in his body, which is how Baran controls his crew. Riker soon discovers that Picard is alive and in the company of these criminals, and is apparently doing business with them under the guise of a rogue archaeologist. Picard tells the crew that Riker is an officer with a history of insubordination who was once even relieved of duty. Picard secretly manufactures a warp drive malfunction, giving Riker a chance to prove himself to Baran.

Later, Picard visits Riker in his quarters. He reveals that he went to study an archaeological site but found that it had been ransacked. Tracing those responsible to a bar, Picard confronted them, but was captured and taken prisoner. He then revealed that the criminals had configured some of their weapons so that if they shot someone or something with one of these modified weapons it would instead activate the transporter and beam away the target – which is why the people in the bar thought he'd been vaporized when shot. Picard managed to convince the crew that he was an archaeologist (named Galen, the name of his mentor who was shown in the episode "The Chase"). Picard reveals that they are looking for specific ancient artifacts of Romulan origin, and that Baran is having Picard search through the relics they've stolen for these specific artifacts.

Picard asks Riker to help him infiltrate the crew of the mercenary ship. As Picard and Baran had never gotten along well, Picard asks Riker to befriend Baran to help learn more about his plans. Picard also asks Riker to play into the role of a less than perfect, insubordinate Starfleet officer who is ready to betray the Federation.

Eventually Picard is able to find the two specific artifacts, which are actually ancient Vulcan artifacts. These artifacts are part of an ancient Vulcan telepathic weapon, the Stone of Gol, which a Vulcan isolationist movement hopes to use to force Vulcan to leave the United Federation of Planets. However, once the weapon is assembled, Picard realizes the true nature of it, once a powerful weapon, but utterly useless against people who don't bear aggressive thoughts. He realizes this is why the Vulcans had found it ineffectual since their civilization definitively adapted to peace 2,000 years ago, and so the useless weapon fell into oblivion. Using this knowledge, Picard manages to defeat the isolationists, and the Vulcan government assures Picard that all three pieces of the weapon would be destroyed.

Back aboard the Enterprise, Lt. Commander Data, although relieved to see Picard and Riker alive, points out that Riker is guilty of defection and that Picard is still, technically, dead, so Picard jokingly suggests to Data to throw Riker in the brig while he goes and gets some much needed rest. Data immediately complies, escorting Riker to the brig, as Riker tries to convince Data that Picard was only joking.

Reception
In 2011, The A.V. Club reviewed "Gambit, Part II" and gave it a "B−", however they were very impressed with dynamic relationship between Data and Worf. They were "thrilled" by the line by Data, "Mr. Worf, I am sorry if I have ended our friendship", and went so far to say they would like to see a spin-off with Captain Data and First Officer Worf. They had rated "Gambit, Part I" a "B", calling it a "fun, goofy romp" and praising its entertainment value as a cliffhanger.

In 2019, Den of Geek suggested it was one of five episodes of Star Trek: The Next Generation that had a higher degree of re-watchability, and had a focus on the character Captain Picard (played by Patrick Stewart). It was noted that in this episode, Data (Brent Spiner) gets to command the Enterprise 1701-D, with Worf (Michael Dorn) as his first officer.

Doux Reviews was very positive about Part I's characters scenes and acting; they praised the interesting struggles Data had in command and Picard and Riker surviving on Baran's spaceship. They felt Part II had good character development, even for the minor roles, and they also praised its moral message.

TV Guide notes the cameo by James Worthy as the very tall alien Koral, pointing out that at the time of his guest star role he was still playing professional basketball.

In 2020, CNET noted "Gambit" for featuring a focus on Captain Picard, but in a new situation where he does not have his normal ship and crew.

Home video releases 
"Gambit" was released on LaserDisc on the United Kingdom on June 9, 1997. The PAL format optical disc had a runtime of 88 minutes, including both Parts of episode.

"Gambit, Part I" was released on LaserDisc in the USA on February 2, 1999, paired with "Interface" on the same double sided disc (NTSC video). "Gambit, Part II" was released at the same time, but paired with "Phantasms" on one double-side LaserDisc.

Both parts of "Gambit" were released on VHS on a single tape (catalog number VHR 4109). "Gambit, Part I" was also release on VHS paired with "Interface" on one cassette (catalog number VHR 2857). "Gambit, Part 2" was released on VHS paired with "Phantasms" on one cassette tape (Catalog number VHR 2858).

"Gambit" was released as part of TNG Season 7 collections on DVD and Blu-Ray formats. Season seven of TNG, which contains this episode was released on Blu-ray disc in January 2015.

References

External links
 
 

 Gambit, Part I at StarTrek.Com
 Gambit, Part II at StarTrek.Com

Star Trek: The Next Generation (season 7) episodes
1993 American television episodes
Television episodes written by Ronald D. Moore
Star Trek: The Next Generation episodes in multiple parts
Television episodes about weapons